Angie F. Newman (Thurston; after first marriage, Kilgore; after second marriage, Newman; December 4, 1837 – April 15, 1910) was an American poet, author, editor, and lecturer of the long nineteenth century. She served as superintendent of jail and prisons, and flower mission work in the State of Nebraska for 25 years, for the Woman's Christian Temperance Union (WCTU); was an acting member of the National Council of Women and the Woman's Relief Corps; and was for several years, vice-president general of the Daughters of the American Revolution. Newman was the first woman delegate ever elected to the Quadrennial Genera; Conference of the Methodist Episcopal Church, and the session at New York City, after debating the question for six days, decided against the admission of women by a majority of one. This led to the submission of the question to the church, which was settled by the admission of women delegates to the Conferences of 1904 and 1908.

Early life and education
Angelia (nickname, "Angie") Louise French Thurston was born in Montpelier, Vermont, December 4, 1837. She was the daughter of Daniel Sylvester and Matilda (Benjamin) Thurston.

When she was ten years old, her mother died, and when she was fifteen years old, her father removed to Madison, Wisconsin. She studied in the academy in Montpelier, and afterwards in Lawrence University, in Appleton, Wisconsin.

Career
She taught in Montpelier at the age of 14 or 15 years, and later in Madison.

From 1862 to 1875, she was an invalid, afflicted with pulmonary weakness. In August, 1871, she removed to Lincoln, Nebraska, when, as she believes, health was restored to her in answer to prayer. From December, 1871, until May, 1879, when she resigned, she held the position of western secretary of the Woman's Foreign Missionary Society, lecturing on missions throughout the West and serving on the editorial staff of The Heathen Woman's Friend, published in Boston, Massachusetts. Her attention being drawn to the condition the Mormon women, in 1883, at the request of Bishop Isaac William Wiley, of the Methodist Episcopal Church, she went to Cincinnati, Ohio, and presented the Mormon problem to the National Home Missionary Society. She was elected western secretary of the society, and a Mormon bureau was created, to push missionary work in Utah, of which she was made secretary. She acted as chairman of a committee appointed to consider the plan of founding a home for Mormon women, who wish to escape from polygamy, to be sustained by the society. She returned home to proceed to Utah in behalf of the society. In a public meeting called in Lincoln, she fell from a platform and was seriously injured, and her plans were frustrated.

During the interval, the Utah gentiles formed a "Home" association, and on her recovery, Newman went as an un-salaried philanthropist to Washington to represent the interests of the Utah gentiles in the Forty-ninth, Fiftieth, and Fifty-first Congresses. She prepared three elaborate arguments on the Mormon problem, one of which she delivered before the Congressional committees. The other two were introduced by Senator George F. Edmunds to the United States Senate, and thousands of copies of each of those three papers were ordered printed by the Senate for Congressional use. The Industrial Christian Home for Polygamous Wives in Salt Lake City, filled with polygamous women and children, attested the value of her work. In Nebraska, Newman served as State superintendent of prison and flower mission work for the WCTU for 12 years. In 1886, a department of Mormon work was created by the national body, and she was elected its superintendent. In 1889, she became a member of the lecture bureau of the same organization. In the cities of every northern and several of the southern States, she spoke from pulpit and platform on temperance, Mormonism, and the social purity movement.

For a long time, she was a contributor to religious and secular journals. In 1878, her "Heathen at Home," a monogram, was published and had large sale. "Iphigenia," another work, was published thereafter. From 1883 to 1892, she was annually commissioned by the successive governors of the State as delegate to the National Conference of Charities and Corrections. In 1888, she was elected a delegate to the Quadrennial General Conference of the Methodist Episcopal Church, which held its session in New York City, the first woman ever elected to a seat in that body. In January, 1890, on the way to Salt Lake, she met with an accident which held her life in jeopardy for 2.5 years, from which she slowly convalesced.

Newman was an extensive traveler, and after a year in Europe, Egypt and Palestine, 1896–1897, with her daughter, she gave a series of lectures on themes associated with the tour. She also wrote a book on the novel experience of "the McKinley Button," which she and her daughter wore on the entire trip, under the title of McKinley Carnations of Memory. She also wrote: An Italian Winter, and The Sacrifice of Iphigenia, having studied her themes in Italy and Greece. Newman engaged several years in preparation of her book, The Tragedy of Christianity or the Vital Issues of Mormon Propagandism.

During the Spanish–American War of 1898, she was appointed hospital inspector for San Francisco, the Hawaiian Islands, and Manila, was absent eight months and executed an important commission.

Personal life
In 1856, she married Frank Kilgore, of Madison, who was a brother-in-law of Bishop Henry White Warren. Her husband lived only a few months after their marriage.

Three years later, she married David Newman, a dry goods merchant of Beaver Dam, Wisconsin, and on August 5, 1859, moved to that town. She had two children of that marriage, a son and a daughter. This husband died by railroad accident in 1893.

Angie Newman died April 15, 1910, in Lincoln, Nebraska, and is buried at Wyuka Cemetery, in  Lincoln.

References

Bibliography

External links
 
 

1837 births
1910 deaths
19th-century American writers
19th-century American women writers
People from Montpelier, Vermont
Woman's Christian Temperance Union people
Lecturers
Lawrence University alumni
Wikipedia articles incorporating text from A Woman of the Century